John Janick is an American record executive. He is the chairman and CEO of Interscope Geffen A&M Records.

Janick has been named to Billboard’s Power 100 list every year since 2014 and was named Variety's Hitmakers Executive of the year in 2018.  He has worked with a number of artists including Fall Out Boy, Panic! At The Disco and Paramore, early in his career, Bruno Mars and Ed Sheeran while head of Elektra Records, and Billie Eilish, 5 Seconds of Summer, J. Cole, Kendrick Lamar, Lady Gaga and Imagine Dragons at Interscope.

Early life
As a young man growing up in Port Charlotte, Florida, Janick was interested in music, not as a musician, but as a promoter.

"When I was a teenager, in the ’90s, I was really into underground music. I’d buy wholesale orders of CDs I loved and then sell them to friends for $10 apiece. Eventually I started putting together compilations. It wasn’t about making a profit as much as it was about turning people on to new music that I loved," he told Entrepreneur magazine.

Record label founder: Fueled by Ramen 1996-2012
In 1996, while a freshman student at the University of Florida, Janick founded the independent record company Fueled By Ramen with Less than Jake drummer Vinnie Fiorello, and signed and developed bands. Janick convinced University of Florida to give him college credits for going on tour with Less than Jake on the Ska Against Racism Tour. Upon their return, they continued to sign bands, market them, cut royalty checks and everything else to promote their music. The label found early success with artist signings Fall Out Boy, Panic! at the Disco, and Paramore.

Janick was met with resistance in promoting his acts, and as a result, opted for alternative methods for Fueled by Ramen such as online sales and social media promotion. Fall Out Boy were the first to achieve sales success, and Panic! at the Disco went on to sell four million albums worldwide.

Warner Music Group: Elektra Records 2009-2012
The sales of the Panic! At the Disco albums prompted the Warner Music Group to buy Fueled by Ramen in 2008, and install Janick as co-president of their Elektra Records label.

Janick signed Fun, Paramore and Twenty One Pilots to Fueled by Ramen, which he continued to run while at Elektra. He executive produced their albums, which went on to sell over one million records each. While at Elektra, Janick oversaw the careers of platinum artists Bruno Mars, Ed Sheeran, and Cee Lo Green.

Interscope Geffen A&M 2012-present
In 2012, Janick was recruited by Interscope head Jimmy Iovine to join the label group as President and COO. The first year at Interscope Geffen A&M, he helped lead the team that produced hits from Robin Thicke, Imagine Dragons, Maroon 5, Eminem and Kendrick Lamar. Janick himself signed Tame Impala and Selena Gomez, both of whom sold well.

When Iovine departed the label group in 2014, Janick was named Chairman/CEO. He explained to Variety his philosophy for music business: "What’s most important to me is being able to spend the time with an artist, and not just trying to get (a song) on every radio station. (To do that), you have to keep the roster in check, and make sure that you’re not doing what a lot of labels have done in the past, where you sign a bunch of things and see what sticks. You sign who you believe in, and you stick with them, like an indie label would."

Under Janick's direction, Interscope has entered into various label alliances including J. Cole’s Dreamville, producer/songwriter Benny Blanco’s Mad Love, LVRN, and The Darkroom.

In 2019, he oversaw releases by Juice WRLD, Lady Gaga’s A Star is Born soundtrack album, DaBaby and the breakout stars Billie Eilish and Summer Walker.

Janick oversees 200 employees at Interscope Geffen A&M.

Personal life
In October 2012, Janick underwent surgery for cancer, with a recurrence in October 2017 for which he received chemotherapy. At that same time, he had brain surgery to remove a benign pituitary adenoma. He fully recovered from both the cancer and the brain tumor.

Janick is married to Mia, has two sons, and an adopted daughter.

Recognition

See also 

 Fueled by Ramen
 Interscope Records

References

External links
Fueled By Ramen

American chief executives in the media industry
A&R people
Living people
1978 births